Hampshire High School (Illinois) (commonly referred to as Hampshire or HHS) is a public high school for students in grades 9 through 12 located in Hampshire, Illinois. Hampshire High School serves students from Hampshire and surrounding areas, including Gilberts, Pingree Grove, Carpentersville, Elgin, and Sleepy Hollow. The school is located at the northern edge of Hampshire.

Hampshire High School is part of Community Unit School District 300, or D300, and is the newest of three high schools serving the district. Feeder schools to Hampshire include Hampshire Middle School and Dundee Middle School. The school is a member of the Illinois High School Association, Fox Valley Conference.

The school colors are purple and white and the mascot is a Whippur, which is typically depicted as a panther or a puma.

History
During the mid-19th century, nine one-room schoolhouses were built in Hampshire Township. These schools served all grade levels until 1838 when a high school and grade school was built at State Street and Mill Street in downtown.

After the school burned down in 1851, it was rebuilt in the same location. The nine one-room schoolhouses served as grade schools into the 20th century.

In 1896 a square brick high school was constructed. Additions added to the capacity of the school and it remained Hampshire High School until a new building was constructed on South State Street. Stairs from the old high school can still be seen.

All Hampshire schools joined Carpentersville-based District 300 in 1948.

Planning for the combined Hampshire High School and Middle School began in 1950 and the school officially opened on Friday, September 5, 1952. It opened with 105 high school students, 46 boys and 59 girls, as well as 58 middle school students, 32 boys and 26 girls. The main sports gym was not finished until January 1953. 1,000 people attended the first open house of the new gym. The first football field was added in 1964 when Ronald Ellett started the football program at Hampshire High School. In 1994 Coach Ron Ellett was inducted into the Illinois High School Coaches' Hall of Fame. During his tenure Coach, Ron Ellett guided the Whippurs to four conference titles, two State Championships and a State Runner-Up. Ron Ellett was also the High School baseball coach and lead the baseball team to their first District Championship in 1977.

The old school building became the middle school exclusively.

Demographics
The demographic breakdown of Hampshire High School's 1,927 students enrolled in 2022-2023 was:

 White - 59.6%
 Hispanic - 25.1%
 Asian - 7.4%
 Black - 3.5%
 Other - 4.4%

16.8% of students were classified as low income.

Facility
The current Hampshire High School building's construction was completed in 2008, ready for the 2008-09 school year, although it was late. The building cost around $70 million and remains the newest high school in District 300. The new site was created to support the exponential population growth in surrounding areas.

The new Hampshire High School contains  under roof and includes 65 traditional classrooms, 11 musical rooms, 5 art rooms, 13 science labs, 3 business labs, 5 industrial arts rooms, 3 family and consumer science labs, 8,100 library books, 75 lunch tables, 2,500 seat competition gym, indoor track, 750 seat auditorium,  6 computer labs, 1,200 data drops,  of network cable, 48 wireless access points, and 89 cameras.

Many of the classrooms are equipped with SmartBoards and every room has a projector, camera, and DVD/VHS player. When at full capacity HHS is expected to be able to accommodate around 2500 students. However, this maximum is still years off due to the slowing of neighborhood building.

Hampshire High School may be noted for its lack of a pool, however when a pool is added it will go on the east side by the locker rooms.

Capacity
Auditorium - 750
Main Competition Gym - 2500
Field House - 1900
Commons - 900
Classrooms - About 35-45
Lecture Hall - 100

Safety
Hampshire High School is filled with surveillance cameras throughout the school grounds. This feature allows administrators to view nearly every inch of the building. There is also a police officer officially on duty at the school. Emergency buttons are placed within the halls and call buttons are in every classroom.

Schedule
Hampshire High School utilizes period scheduling. Students attend nine classes a semester, two semesters a year. All District 300 high schools use the period format.

A school day goes as follows:

1st period (7:30-8:15)
2nd period (8:20-9:05)
3rd period (9:10-9:58)
4th period (10:03-10:48)
5th period (10:53-11:38)
6th period (11:43-12:28)
7th period (12:33-1:18)
8th period (1:23-2:08)
9th period (2:13-2:58)

Each of the nine classes are 45 minutes long with 5-minute passing periods. Each passing period ends with a "Musical Minute" where a variety of popular songs are chosen and played. An extra 3 minutes during the 3rd period is to account for time lost in class due to announcements. The total school day lasts for seven hours and 23 minutes. 
Starting in the 2022-2023 school year, late starts were implemented in place of the early releases where once a month, or in case of severe weather, the school day starts at 9:30, but ends at the usual 2:58. Classes are shortened to 32 minutes and passing periods are five minutes.

A late start day goes as follows:

1st period (9:30-10:02)
2nd period (10:07-10:39)
3rd period (10:44-11:16)
4th period (11:21-11:53)
5th period (11:58-12:30)
6th period (12:35-1:07)
7th period (1:12-1:44)
8th period (1:49-2:21)
9th period (2:26-2:58)

Industrial Arts
On the far west side of the building is the industrial arts wing. There one can find a Computer Aided Design (CAD) lab, electricity lab, wood lab, welding lab, autos lab, and advanced manufacturing lab. The CAD lab features new widescreen computers with AutoDesk AutoCAD 2010 and Google SketchUp installed. The wood lab is home to a state-of-the-art SawStop table saw which is usually not found in schools due to the $10,000 price tag. In addition, there is about $7,000 worth of Bosch tools and a $30,000 ShopBot CNC machine. This is not the only wood lab, however, there is also one on the east side behind the auditorium. This shop, called the scene shop, is used to fabricate all of the sets required for school plays.

Athletics
Conference: Fox Valley

Arena names: Main Gym and Field House

Sports Teams
Boys
Baseball
Basketball
Cross Country
Football
Golf
Hockey (Club Sport)
Lacrosse (Club Sport)
Soccer
Tennis
Track and Field
Wrestling

Girls
Basketball
Cheerleading
Cross Country
Golf
Lacrosse
Poms
Soccer
Softball
Tennis
Track and Field
Volleyball

Competitive Clubs
Academic Challenge
Debate Team
Math Team
Scholastic Bowl
Skills USA

Non-Competitive Clubs
Art Club
Asian American and Pacific Islander Club
ASL Club
Chess Club
Barbell Club
Black Student Alliance
Book Club
Business Club
Drama Club
Environmental Club
Fellowship of Christian Athletes
Fishing Club
French Club
Future Educators Club
Gender and Sexualities Alliance
Journalism Club
Literacy Magazine
Medical Careers Club
Musical
National Honors Society
Robotics Club
Spanish Club
Student Ambassadors
Student Council
Tri-M
Videogamers
Yearbook

State championships
Chess Team: State Runner-up: 1979 (Coach John Krewer)
Football: State Champs: 1976(Coach Ronald Ellett),
Football: State Runner-up: 1978 (Coach Ronald Ellett)
Football: State Champions  1979 (Coach Ronald Ellett),
Football: State Champions 1995 (Coach Dan Cavenaugh)
Girls' Basketball: 3rd Place-State 2003 (Coach Milt Awe)
Girls' Basketball: State Runner Up 2004 (Coach Sue Ellett)
Girls' Soccer: 4th Place-State 2007 (Coach Patrick O'Brien)
Girls' Soccer: Runner-up: 2008 (Coach Patrick O'Brien)
Girls' Volleyball: Runner-up: 2007
Girls' Track: Natalie Salinas- Discuss 4th Place-State 1999, Discuss 2nd Place-State 2000, and Discus State Champ 2001. Erin Salinas- Discus State Champ 2002
Boys' Track: Quinn Walker- 300 M Hurdles State Champ 2008
Girls' Golf: Connie Ellett- State Runner-up 2011
Girls' Varsity Cheer: 2015 State Champions (Coach Rachael Fischer)

Math Team
In 2010 and 2011, the HHS math team came in third place in the Big Northern Conference. Awards have included 1st-place finishes in the subjects of Geometry, Calculus, and Algebra.

National Honor Society
The National Honor Society, or NHS, is a major part of HHS. For the 2010-11 school season more than 50 students were inducted into NHS. NHS consists of volunteer work and school improvement. Students in NHS must fulfill a 60-hour minimum of community service.

References

External links
 HHS D300 Homepage

Public high schools in Illinois
Schools in Kane County, Illinois
Educational institutions established in 1838
1838 establishments in Illinois